Shaheen Asmayee or the Asmayee Falcons is a professional football club from Afghanistan. They play in the Afghanistan Champions League, representing Greater Kabul. In domestic football, the club has won a record 5 Afghan Premier League titles. They are the only team to have won consecutive titles, and have achieved it twice.

History
The club was founded in August 2012 by the creation of the Afghan Premier League and its players were chosen through a reality television show called Maidan-E-Sabz (Green Field). The club's name refers to the Asmayi Mountain in Kabul.
Each Premier League team represents a particular region of Afghanistan. Shaheen Asmayee represents the capital city, Kabul. The name of the club comes from the Pashto language name of a hill near Kabul – Asmayee.

In 2013, the second season of the Afghan Premier League, Shaheen Asmayee F.C won the League, defeating Simorgh Alborz F.C. They won 3–1 in extra time. All the players received medals for their finals achievements with strong supporting crowds in Kabul.

In 2014, Shaheen Asmayee reaches the final and defeated 3–2 Oqaban Hindukush F.C.

In 2015, they were runners-up finalists to De Spin Ghar Bazan F.C.

In 2016–2017, they twice defeated in the final De Maiwand Atalan F.C.

In 2018 and 2019, they lost in the final to Toofan Harirod F.C.

In 2020, Shaheen Asmayee F.C won the League, defeating Simorgh Alborz F.C. 1–0.

They are the only team to have won back-to-back titles and have having achieved it twice. They have become champions in the Roshan Afghan Premier League five times, a record most titles.

Continental History

Honours

National
Afghan Premier League
Champions (6): 2013, 2014, 2016, 2017, 2020, 2021
Runners-up (3): 2015, 2018, 2019

Players
Current places of players:

References

 
Football clubs in Afghanistan
Sport in Kabul
2012 establishments in Afghanistan
Association football clubs established in 2012